Vera Kingston (4 February 1917 – September 1996), later known by her married name Vera Robinson, was an English competition swimmer of the 1930s who represented Great Britain in the Olympics and swam for England in the British Empire Games.

At the 1936 Summer Olympics in Berlin, she was eliminated in the first round of the 200-metre breaststroke event.

At the 1934 Empire Games she won the silver medal with the English team in the 3×110-yard medley competition.  In the 200-yard breaststroke contest she finished fifth.

External links
Vera Kingston's profile at Sports Reference.com

1917 births
1996 deaths
Sportspeople from Leicester
Olympic swimmers of Great Britain
Swimmers at the 1936 Summer Olympics
Swimmers at the 1934 British Empire Games
Commonwealth Games silver medallists for England
English breaststroke swimmers
English female swimmers
Commonwealth Games medallists in swimming
20th-century English women
Medallists at the 1934 British Empire Games